Alphonse Laurencic (Enghien-les-Bains, France, 2 July 1902 – Camp de la Bota, Barcelona, 9 July 1939) was a French painter and architect.

Biography 
Laurencic was born in France as the son of Slovene immigrants from the Austro-Hungarian Empire. Laurencic supported the Republican forces fighting Francisco Franco's Nationalist army in Spain. In 1938, he helped build Civil War jail cells intended to torture Nationalist supporters which resembled 3-D modern art paintings by surrealist Salvador Dalí and Bauhaus artist Wassily Kandinsky.

According to Spanish art historian Jose Milicua, who found papers from Laurencic's 1939 trial by a Nationalist military court, Laurencic told the court the cells, in Barcelona, featured sloping beds at a 20-degree angle that were almost impossible to sleep on. They also had irregularly shaped bricks on the floor that prevented prisoners from walking backwards or forwards. The walls in the 2 m x 1 m cells were covered in surrealist patterns designed to make prisoners distressed and confused, and lighting effects were used to make the artwork even more dizzying. Some of them had a stone seat designed to make occupants instantly slide to the floor, while other cells were painted in tar and became stiflingly hot in the summer. Laurencic told the court the cells were built after he heard reports of similar structures being built elsewhere in Spain.

Bibliography 
 Checas de Barcelona, de César Alcalá. Belacqua. Barcelona, 2005. 
 Las checas del terror, de César Alcalá. LibrosLibres. 2007.  
 La causa general, Akrón, 2008. 
 El terror staliniano en la España republicana, Felix Llaugé. Editorial Aura. Barcelona, 1974.
 La persecución religiosa en España durante la Segunda República, 1931–1939 Vicente Cárcel Ortí. Ediciones Rialp, 1990 – 404 páginas
 Checas de Barcelona: el terror y la represión estalinista en Catalunya, de César Alcalá Giménez. Edit. Belacqua de ediciones y publicaciones, S.L. . Barcelona, 2005.

References

External links 
 'Jail cells "made from modern art"'. BBC News. 23 March 2003.

1902 births
1939 deaths
People from Enghien-les-Bains
French people of the Spanish Civil War
20th-century French painters
20th-century French male artists
French male painters
20th-century French architects
Spanish trade unionists
Confederación Nacional del Trabajo members
People executed by Francoist Spain
French people of Slovenian descent
Executed people from Île-de-France
French people executed abroad